John Congreve  was an Irish politician.

Congreve was born in County Cork and educated at  Trinity College, Dublin.

Congreve represented  Killyleagh from 1761to 1768.

References

People from County Cork
Irish MPs 1727–1760
Members of the Parliament of Ireland (pre-1801) for County Down constituencies
Alumni of Trinity College Dublin